Homer Byington may refer to:
 A. Homer Byington, American diplomat, politician, newspaper publisher and editor
 Homer M. Byington Jr., American ambassador